Cempaka (Magnolia champaca) is a large flowering evergreen tree in the family Magnoliaceae. 

Cempaka may also refer to:

Places 
 Cempaka Baru, Kemayoran, an administrative village in the Kemayoran district of Indonesia
 Cempaka Putih, a district of Central Jakarta, Indonesia
 Cempaka Putih Barat, Cempaka Putih, an administrative village in the Cempaka Putih district
 Cempaka Putih Timur, Cempaka Putih, an administrative village in the Cempaka Putih district

Other uses 
 Cempaka diamond mine, in Indonesia and in the world.[1] The mine is located in South Kalimantan, Borneo
 Cempaka LRT station, a Malaysian low-rise rapid transit station in Ampang Jaya, Selangor
 Cempaka Schools, a private school in Kuala Lumpur, Malaysia
 List of storms named Cempaka, tropical cyclones

See also 
 Chempaka (disambiguation)